Steve Blyth  is an Australian former rugby league footballer who played in the 1970s and 1980s. He played for the Newtown Jets and the Western Suburbs Magpies in the New South Wales Rugby League (NSWRL) competition.

Playing career
Blyth made his first grade debut for Western Suburbs in 1976.  In 1978, Western Suburbs appointed Roy Masters as their new head coach.  Masters turned Western Suburbs from a team that had been in decline since the 1960s in to a competitive team which could compete for the premiership.  Blyth made 14 appearances for Wests as they claimed the minor premiership in 1978 but fell short of a grand final appearance.  

In 1979, Blyth left Wests to join Newtown.  Newtown would go on to finish second last avoiding their fourth consecutive wooden spoon.  Under the coaching of Warren Ryan, Newtown went from a struggling team to premiership contenders.  Newtown would go on to reach the 1981 NSWRL grand final against Parramatta with Blyth being selected to play for in the starting side.

Newtown trailed Parramatta 7-6 at halftime but Parramatta stormed home in the second half to win 20-11 and claim their first premiership at the Sydney Cricket Ground.  Blyth played on with Newtown in 1982 but they were unable to replicate their form from the previous season and missed out on the finals.  Blyth retired at the end of the 1982 season.

References

1954 births
Living people
Newtown Jets players
Western Suburbs Magpies players
Australian rugby league players
Rugby league second-rows
Rugby league props
Rugby league players from Sydney